Maddie Evangelous is an American ice hockey forward, currently playing for the Connecticut Whale in the Premier Hockey Federation (PHF).

Career 

Across 112 games with Elmira, Evangelous put up 108 points. In 2016, she was named to the ECAC West All-Rookie Team. She played lacrosse for the college as well as hockey.

In 2019, she signed her first professional contract with the Connecticut Whale. In her first season with the Whale, she scored 1 point in 22 games as the team finished last in the league.

Personal life 

Outside of hockey, Evangelous is a nurse.

References

External links 
 

Connecticut Whale (PHF) players
Elmira College alumni
1995 births
Living people
American women's ice hockey forwards
21st-century American women